The Nissan NR20A is a prototype four-stroke 2.0-litre single-turbocharged inline-4 racing engine, developed and produced by Nissan for the Super GT series. The NR20A engine is fully custom-built.

Applications
Nissan GT-R GT500 Nismo
Nissan Fairlady Z GT500

References

Engines by model
Gasoline engines by model
Nissan engines
Four-cylinder engines
Straight-four engines
Nissan in motorsport